Harry James Davenport (August 22, 1902 – December 19, 1977) was a Democratic member of the U.S. House of Representatives from Pennsylvania.

Biography
Harry J. Davenport was born in Wilmerding, Pennsylvania.  He worked as a newspaper publisher.  He was an unsuccessful candidate for nomination in 1946, but was elected as a Democrat to the Eighty-first Congress.  He was an unsuccessful candidate for reelection in 1950 against Republican Harmar D. Denny, Jr. and 1960.  He worked as a lecturer and book salesman, and resided in Millvale, Pennsylvania, until his death. He died on December 19, 1977.

Sources 
 
 The Political Graveyard

1902 births
1977 deaths
People from Wilmerding, Pennsylvania
Democratic Party members of the United States House of Representatives from Pennsylvania
20th-century American politicians